Lillian Russell is a 1940 American biographical film of the life of the singer and actress. The screenplay was by William Anthony McGuire. The film was directed by Irving Cummings and produced by Darryl F. Zanuck. It stars Alice Faye in the title role, Don Ameche, Henry Fonda and Edward Arnold as Diamond Jim Brady.

Richard Day and Joseph C. Wright were nominated for an Academy Award for Best Art Direction, Black-and-White.

Plot
Helen Leonard (Faye) has a beautiful voice. As she grows up, she trains to become an opera singer. Her instructor, however, informs her that her voice is pleasing, but not suitable for grand opera. Returning home one day, she and her grandmother (Westley) are saved by a handsome young man, newspaperman Alexander Moore (Fonda). Meanwhile, Helen's mother, Cynthia (Peterson), has political aspirations, but only receives a handful of votes for mayor.

While singing one evening, Helen is overheard by vaudeville impresario Tony Pastor (Carrillo), who hires her to sing at his theater. She is given a new name, Lillian Russell, and quickly rises to fame as the toast of New York. As the years pass, Lillian becomes one of the most revered stars in America. She has many suitors, including financier Diamond Jim Brady (Arnold), Jesse Lewisohn (William), and composer Edward Solomon (Ameche). She eventually marries Edward and they move to London, where Gilbert and Sullivan are writing an operetta especially for her.

Alexander Moore returns and makes a contract with Lillian to write stories about her rise to fame. But tragedy soon strikes when Edward dies one evening while composing a song for her. Lillian cancels the interviews and makes an appearance in the show, singing the song her husband composed for her, "Blue Lovebird."

Lillian returns to America and is, by this time, the greatest stage attraction of the century. Alexander comes to see Lillian after a new show and the two are happily reunited.

The plot takes many liberties with the facts, in particular giving her only two husbands instead of four.

Cast
 Alice Faye as Lillian Russell
 Don Ameche as Edward Solomon
 Henry Fonda as Alexander Moore
 Edward Arnold as Diamond Jim Brady
 Warren William as The Famous J.L.
 Leo Carrillo as Tony Pastor
 Helen Westley as Grandma Leonard
 Dorothy Peterson as Cynthia Leonard
 Ernest Truex as Charles K. Leonard
 Nigel Bruce as William Gilbert
 Lynn Bari as Edna McCauley
 Claud Allister as Arthur Sullivan (as Claude Allister)
 Joe Weber as Joe Weber (as Weber)
 Lew Fields as Lew Field (as Fields)
 Eddie Foy Jr. as Eddie Foy Sr.
 Una O'Connor as Marie 
 Joseph Cawthorn as Leopold Damrosch
 Diane Fisher as Dorothy
 Elyse Knox as Lillian Russell's Sister
 Joan Valerie as Lillian Russell's Sister
 Alice Armand as Lillian Russell's Sister
 William B. Davidson as President Cleveland (as William Davidson)
 Hal K. Dawson as Chauffeur
 Charles Halton as Dr' Dobbins
 Robert Emmett Keane as Jeweler 
 Harry Hayden as Mr. Sloane 
 Frank Darien as Coachman
 Frank Sully as Hank 
 Ottola Nesmith as Miss Smyth
 Ferike Boros as Mrs. Rose
 Robert Homans as Stage Doorman
 William Haade as Soldier
 Irving Bacon as Soldier 
 Paul E. Burns as Soldier (as Paul Burns)
 Cecil Cunningham as Mrs. Hobbs

Songs
Many pre-1900s songs were used for the film, including "Ma Blushin' Rosie", "Come Down Ma Evenin' Star", and "After the Ball". Several new songs were also written for the film, including "Adored One" and most notably, "Blue Lovebird", composed by Gus Kahn and Bronisław Kaper.

See also
 Diamond Jim, a 1935 film starring Edward Arnold, again as Jim Brady

References

External links
 
 

1940 films
1940s biographical drama films
1940s musical drama films
1940s historical films
20th Century Fox films
American biographical drama films
American historical films
American musical drama films
Biographical films about singers
American black-and-white films
1940s English-language films
Films directed by Irving Cummings
Films set in the 1870s
Films set in the 1880s
Films set in the 1890s
Films set in the 1900s
Films set in London
Cultural depictions of Grover Cleveland
Works about Gilbert and Sullivan
1940 drama films
1940s American films